Smörgåstårta ("sandwich-cake" or "sandwich-torte") is a dish of Swedish origin popular in Sweden, Estonia (called "võileivatort"), Finland (called "voileipäkakku" and "smörgåstårta") and Iceland (called "brauðterta" ). It is not a cake, but has large amounts of filling and garnish, similar to a layered cream cake.

A smörgåstårta is normally made up of several layers of white or light rye bread with creamy fillings in between. The fillings and toppings vary, but egg and mayonnaise are often the base; additional filling may vary greatly but often include one or more of the following: liver pâté, olives, shrimp, ham, various cold cuts, caviar, tomato, cucumber, grapes, lemon slices, cheese, and smoked salmon.

Smörgåstårta is served cold and cut like a dessert cake. The types of sandwich cakes vary from meat, fish, combinations of cheeses and meats, to vegan. The top garnish often reflects the ingredients used as a filling. In Finland,  is a standard dish at family gatherings such as birthday parties, weddings, or funerals.

See also 
 Sandwich-loaf

External links 

 Photo recipe for Smörgåstårta
 Decorating a sandwich cake (smörgåstårta)

Cakes
Estonian cuisine
Finnish cuisine
Icelandic cuisine
Scandinavian cuisine
Swedish cuisine
Bread dishes
Egg sandwiches